This is a list of hospitals in Paraguay.

Asunción
Centro Médico Bautista
Centro Medico La Costa
Centro Médico Pro-Med
Cruz Roja Paraguaya
Hospital Adjunto de la UNA
Hospital General Barrio Obrero
Hospital Central de las FF.AA.

Hospital de Tuberculosis
Hospital Privado Francés
Hospital Materno Infantil
Hospital Militar Central
Hospital Neuropsiquiátrico
Hospital San Jorge
Hospital San Pablo
Instituto de Medicina Tropical
Instituto de Previsión Social (IPS)
Policlínico Policial Rigoberto Caballero
Sanatorio Adventista
Sanatorio Americano
Sanatorio Español
Sanatorio Italiano
Sanatorio Migone-Battilana
Sanatorio Professor Doctor Juan Max Boettner
Sanatorio Santa Clara
Sanatorio San Roque

Ciudad del Este 
Hospital Itaipú
Hospital Luz y Vida
Hospital Regional de Ciudad del Este
Sanatorio Central
Sanatorio Internacional
Sanatorio Sagrada Familia
IPS

Encarnación
Hospital Pediátrico Municipal
Hospital Regional
Hospital Tajy
Sanatorio la Trinidad

IPS

San Ignacio
Centro Materno Infantil SOS Hermann Gmeiner
Clínica Privada San Luis
Clínica Privada San Roque
Hospital Distrital de San Ignacio
IPS

San Lorenzo
Hospital Materno Infantil de San Lorenzo
Clínica Centromed

Itauguá
Hospital Nacional de Itauguá

References

Paraguay
Hospitals

Paraguay